Charonectria is a genus of fungi in the family Hyponectriaceae.

References

External links
Index Fungorum

Xylariales